Tillandsia eltoniana is a species in the genus Tillandsia. This species is endemic to Brazil.

References

eltoniana
Endemic flora of Brazil